The Prospect Junior High and Elementary School in the Mount Washington neighborhood of Pittsburgh, Pennsylvania is a building from 1931. It was listed on the National Register of Historic Places in 1986. The school closed in 2006, and the building has since been converted into apartments.

References

School buildings on the National Register of Historic Places in Pennsylvania
Art Deco architecture in Pennsylvania
School buildings completed in 1931
Schools in Pittsburgh
Pittsburgh History & Landmarks Foundation Historic Landmarks
National Register of Historic Places in Pittsburgh